Eldgjá ("fire canyon") is a volcano and a canyon in Iceland. This fissure experienced a major eruption around 939 CE, which was the largest effusive eruption in recent history.

While Icelandic records about the effects of the eruption are sparse, paleoclimate proxies and historical records from China, Europe and the Islamic world describe widespread impacts on the Northern Hemisphere climate. The Eldgjá eruption produced a noticeable cooling of the climate, with resulting cold winters and food crises across Eurasia.

Geology 
The interaction between the Mid-Atlantic Ridge and the Iceland hotspot has given rise to the stack of volcanic rocks that forms Iceland. Volcanoes on Iceland occur in four volcanic zones; the North Volcanic Zone in northeastern Iceland, the East Volcanic Zone in the southeast, the West Volcanic Zone in the southwest and the Snæfellsnes Volcanic Zone in the west. The first three of these form an upside-down Y structure, with each volcanic zone consisting of volcanic and tectonic lineaments that extend from north-northeast to south-southwest. These lineaments are dotted with volcanic edifices; Eldgjá lies in the East Volcanic Zone where there are no large shield volcanoes but numerous long fissures, including Laki.

Glaciation has influenced volcanic activity on Iceland, and the occurrence of large eruptions—such as the  Þjórsá Lava 8,600 years ago—in the early Holocene has been attributed to the unloading of the crust caused by the melting of Pleistocene ice. This process does not appear to have influenced the Eldgjá eruption however. However, Eldgjá's eruption may have altered the shape of the Katla volcano and thus modified the behaviour of its glaciers. Glacial meltwater drains from Katla through several subglacial "tunnels"; one of which coincides with the Eldgjá lineament, and geothermal activity on the lineament drives melting and the formation of cauldron-shaped depressions in the northeastern sector of the Myrdalsjökull Ice Cap. Moraines from the ice cap extend to the Eldgjá lineament.

The rocks erupted by Eldgjá are mainly alkali basalts, which have a uniform composition and contain phenocrysts of clinopyroxene, olivine, magnetite and plagioclase. There are also a small amount of tholeiitic rocks. The composition of Katla magmas shows evidence of long-term variations that appear to reflect a long-term cycle of its magmatic system. The Eldgjá eruption appears to be the beginning of one such cycle that continues to the present-day. There is evidence that eruptions of Eyjafjallajökull often precede eruptions at Katla, raising concerns after the 2010 eruption of Eyjafjallajökull that Katla may erupt again.

Geography and geomorphology 

 means "fire gorge" and is a reference to the fissure that makes up the volcano; the term is also used with other Icelandic volcanoes. It is situated between Landmannalaugar and Kirkjubæjarklaustur. The Ófærufoss waterfall, a tourist attraction, lies in the main Eldgjá fissure. There used to be an oft-photographed natural bridge at Ófærufoss, which collapsed during the early 1990s. The northern part of Eldgjá, including Ófærufoss, and surrounding areas, have been a part of Vatnajökull National Park since 2011. There are information centres and picnic places at Eldgjá.

The canyon is subdivided into four segments from southwest to northeast. The canyon extends between the Öldufellsjökull glacier  of the Myrdalsjökull Ice Cap (the ice cap covers part of the fissure) in the southwest, stretches across mountainous terrain and almost reaches the Vatnajökull Ice Cap to the northeast at Stakafell  mountain. It is the longest volcanic fissure in Iceland.

Ground fractures, hornitos, normal faults, lava lakes, pyroclastic cones and spatter ramparts make up the Eldgjá lineament; the cones form alignments and have red-to-gray colours and consist of alternating layers of lava, scoria and spatter, with the scoria and spatter sometimes fused together until they resemble lava flows. There is evidence that the Eldgjá fissure existed before the 930s eruption. Ongoing activity of the fissure can be seen in the form of ground deformation.

The Eldgjá is part of the wider Katla volcano, which features a series of fissures, as well as a caldera covered by the Myrdalsjökull Ice Cap. There are other volcanic centres in the area, some of which had large fissure-fed eruptions within historical memory.

10th century eruption 
The Eldgjá eruption was the largest Holocene eruption of the Katla system and the only historical eruption of this volcano outside of its caldera. These episodes did not occur simultaneously across the entire length of the Eldgjá; rather the eruption commenced in the caldera and propagated northeastward. Intense lava fountaining, explosive eruptions and the effusion of lava took place.

The eruption has been linked to an episode of active continental rifting in the 930s, during which the injection of magma into dykes led to deformation of the ground surface and the evacuation of magmas from the Katla magmatic system. Part of this magma entered into the Katla magma chamber, triggering the release of silicic magmas that form part of the tephra and were at least for some time erupted simultaneously with basaltic magmas.

Dating
The Eldgjá eruption took place in the 930s, but its exact date has long been uncertain. Early research put its beginning during 934-938. Later research published in 2015 indicated that it began in 939 and likely ended in 940, but may have continued for several years more. Further confusion is created by the fact that the Eldgjá eruption occurred only seven years before the Millennium Eruption of Paektu Mountain on the China–Korea border. Some climatic effects of the Eldgjá eruption may actually result from the Paektu eruption. That eruption, in 946 CE, may have produced only a small amount of sulfate aerosols, far less than Eldgjá. A tephra layer at Katla originally attributed to a 1000 CE eruption is now considered to be part of the Eldgjá eruption.

Products
The eruption produced two fields of (mostly pahoehoe) lava flows emanating from the southern and central sectors of the Eldgjá fracture. Flowing through lava tubes, the lava flows were channelled down river valleys and gorges and eventually reached the sea. The lavas buried traces of earlier eruptions and obstructed river valleys, forcing the rivers to change their course, and altered the terrain so that large parts of the plains east of Katla can no longer be reached by jökulhlaups (glacier meltwater flood) from the volcano. Later eruptions from Laki have buried many of the northeastern Eldgjá lava flows.

About  dense rock equivalent of mostly basaltic ejecta became  of tephra, which was emplaced mainly south and southeast from Eldgjá. The tephra was formed through alternating magmatic and phreatomagmatic processes, and is more complex than common Katla tephras. External water (such as from ice melt) did not play a major role in driving the explosivity of the eruption. Part of the eruption occurred underneath the Katla ice cap; this part also gave rise to the Kriki  hyaloclastite on the eastern side of the ice cap, a product of an interaction between lava and ice. The Eldgjá eruption was accompanied by jökulhlaups from the northern, eastern and perhaps also southern part of Myrdalsjökull Ice Cap but the burial of its deposits by later glacier meltwater floods and lavas make it difficult to trace the precise extent of the flood.

Tephra and aerosol emissions
Both tephra layers and sulfate layers linked to the Eldgjá eruption occur in Greenland, where they have been recorded from ice cores in the form of layers where the ice contains more acids, salts and tiny glass shards. Tephra layers from the eruption have been used to date lake sediments and ice cores in the Northern Hemisphere, volcanic eruptions at Eyjafjallajökull and other Icelandic volcanoes, glacier advances on the island, and events in Viking Age Iceland. 

Large volcanic eruptions can produce veils of aerosols in the atmosphere from sulfur dioxide, which reduce the amount of sunlight reaching Earth's surface and alter its climate. The Eldgjá eruption is the largest volcanic atmospheric pollution event of the last several millennia and traces of platinum erupted by the volcano have been found across the Western Hemisphere, where they have been used to date archaeological sites.

The climate impact of the Eldgjá has been recorded in cave deposits, historical reports, ice cores, tree rings and other environmental records potentially as far south as Australia. Volcanic aerosols often weaken the monsoons that feed the Nile River in Africa; during 939 the water levels of the river were unusually low. Conversely, increased flooding in Europe after the Eldgjá and other volcanic eruptions during the 10th century have been correlated to declines in Poland's Alnus trees.

Human impacts 

Even though Iceland was already settled at that time and the impacts of the eruption were severe, there are no contemporary historical records of the eruption. Anecdotal reports are recorded in the Book of Settlements, which was written about 200 years later. Events in the poem Völuspá may record the eruption or another eruption of Katla. According to the Book of Settlements, lava flows forced settlers east of Katla off their land; two settlements or farms belonging to at least two settlements in the Álftaver  area southeast of Katla had to be abandoned due to damage from lava flows and sources of the 12th century define it a "wasteland". The events and impact of the eruption may have stopped the settlement of the island and could played a role in stimulating the Christianization of Iceland.

Unlike the local impacts on Iceland, the effects of the Eldgjá eruption on Europe appear in the historical record. Darkened skies were reported from Germany, Ireland, Italy, Portugal and Spain although the interpretation of contemporary reports as referencing atmospheric phenomena linked to the Eldgjá eruption is controversial. Reportedly, winters in Europe and China between 939-942 were severe, with the sea and canals freezing, while droughts occurred during the summer months. Food crises reported in China, the Maghreb, the Levant and Western Europe at that time have been linked to the Eldgjá eruption. More tentatively, the downfall of the Later Jin Dynasty in China, a decrease of human activity on Ireland and rebellions in Japan have been connected to the Eldgjá eruption.

Impacts of a repeat 
Large fissure-fed effusive eruptions in Iceland reoccur every few centuries. The much smaller 2010 eruption of Eyjafjallajökull caused worldwide disruptions of air travel, with economic losses of over $1 billion for airlines alone, because volcanic ash can interfere with the operation of airplane engines. Additional hazards of a widespread aerosol layer are its corrosive effects on equipment, decreased visibility leading to accidents on the sea, as well as health hazards resulting from the aerosols. The impact could extend to North Africa.

See also
Geography of Iceland
Glacial lake outburst flood
Iceland hotspot
Iceland plume
List of glaciers of Iceland
List of lakes of Iceland
Timeline of volcanism on Earth
Volcanism of Iceland
List of volcanic eruptions in Iceland

References

Sources

External links

Information on volcanism in the area
Photos

Active volcanoes
Canyons and gorges of Iceland
East Volcanic Zone of Iceland
Fissure vents
Katla (volcano)
Mountains of Iceland
VEI-6 volcanoes
Volcanoes of Iceland